Khaled Awaji (born 19 June 1990) is a Saudi Arabian footballer who plays as a defender.

Career
He formerly played for Hetten, Al-Shabab, again Hetten, Abha, again Hetten, Al-Muzahimiyyah, Al-Bateen, and Sdoos.

References

External links
 

1990 births
Living people
Saudi Arabian footballers
Association football defenders
Hetten FC players
Al-Shabab FC (Riyadh) players
Abha Club players
Al-Muzahimiyyah Club players
Al-Bateen FC players
Sdoos Club players
Saudi Professional League players
Saudi First Division League players
Saudi Second Division players
Saudi Fourth Division players